Mladen Dabanovič (born 13 September 1971) is a Slovenian former professional footballer who played as a goalkeeper.

Career
Dabanovič started his professional career with Maribor and Rudar Velenje, before moving to Belgian side Sporting Lokeren in 1999. In January 2004, he returned to Slovenia where he played for Drava Ptuj for four seasons.

International career
Dabanovič won 25 international caps for Slovenia between 1998 and 2003. He was the country's first-choice goalkeeper at the Euro 2000 finals and played in all of their three group matches at the tournament. He also played for Slovenia in their group match against Paraguay at the 2002 FIFA World Cup finals.

Honours
Maribor
Slovenian Cup: 1991–92, 1993–94

Rudar Velenje
Slovenian Cup: 1997–98

See also
Slovenian international players
NK Maribor players

External links
Player profile at NZS 

1971 births
Living people
Sportspeople from Maribor
Yugoslav footballers
Slovenian footballers
Association football goalkeepers
Slovenian expatriate footballers
NK Maribor players
NK Rudar Velenje players
NK Drava Ptuj players
NK Aluminij players
K.S.C. Lokeren Oost-Vlaanderen players
Slovenian expatriate sportspeople in Belgium
Expatriate footballers in Belgium
Slovenian PrvaLiga players
UEFA Euro 2000 players
2002 FIFA World Cup players
Slovenia international footballers
Belgian Pro League players